The National Association of County and City Health Officials (NACCHO) is the Washington, DC-based organization representing 2,800 local public health departments in the U.S.  These city, county, metropolitan, district, and tribal departments work to protect and promote health and well-being for all people in their communities by coordinating programs and services that make it easier for people to be healthy and safe from public health emergencies.

Purpose
NACCHO provides leadership, up-to-date information, subject matter expertise, and other resources to strengthen local health departments’ program work in a wide array of public health and safety areas including the following:
Community Health topics such as chronic disease prevention, tobacco control, health and disability, infectious disease prevention and control, immunization, injury prevention, maternal and child health, adolescent health, and health equity.
Environmental Health topics such as the public health effects of climate change, food safety, environmental health tracking and assessment, and environmental justice.
Public Health Infrastructure and Systems topics such as: accreditation and quality improvement, community health status indicators, public health informatics, performance standards, public health law, and regionalization of public health services.
Public Health Preparedness topics such as local readiness for pandemic influenza, Medical Reserve Corps, Project Public Health Ready, and Strategic National Stockpile.

Local health departments look to NACCHO for the following:
Grant assistance for emergency preparedness, food safety, HIV/AIDS prevention, and other programmatic work taking place at the local level. Resources and easy-to-use tools in many subject areas, including accreditation, epidemiology, healthy community design, influenza, emergency preparedness, and quality improvement.
Regional and national training courses, meetings and conferences that help local health department staff connect to and learn from one another.
Access to marketing and branding materials, such as the public health logo, that can help them raise the visibility and perceived value of governmental public health. Local health departments are encouraged to use the public health logo in their own communities to link their work to other health departments across the country.
Advocacy with federal policymakers about the importance of allocating adequate resources for local public health; passage of sound public health legislation, and support of sensible policies to address the myriad of health challenges facing communities.

Vision
Health, equity, and security for all people in their communities

Mission
To be a leader, partner, catalyst, and voice for local public health departments.

History
The history of NACCHO dates back to the 1960s, with the formation of the National Association of County Health Officials (NACHO), an independent affiliate of the National Association of Counties. As the U.S. federal, state, and local public health systems continued to expand, NACHO combined with the U.S. Conference of Local Health Officers, an organization affiliated with the United States Conference of Mayors, to form the National Association of County and City Health Officials (NACCHO) in 1994. This unified organization more closely represents all
governmental local health departments, including counties, cities, city/counties, districts, and townships. In 2001, NACCHO expanded its scope to include tribal public health agencies serving tribal communities on reservation lands and in 2012 to include counties and cities in the U.S. territories. Today, active membership in NACCHO continues to grow with about 2,800 local health departments.

Governance
NACCHO is governed by a 27-member Board of Directors composed of health officials from around the country elected by their peers, a representative for Tribal health departments, and ex officio members representing the National Association of Counties, of which NACCHO is an affiliate, and the U.S. Conference of Mayors. The Board of Directors meets four times a year. The NACCHO Executive Committee includes four NACCHO officers and three Board members representing different geographic regions and population size.  Approximately 380 NACCHO members serve on 40 committees and workgroups. Most committees meet by conference call and have one face-to-face meeting each year

References

External links

Public health organizations
Medical and health organizations based in Washington, D.C.
Health care-related professional associations based in the United States